The It Won't Be Soon Before Long Tour was the third concert tour by the American pop rock band Maroon 5, in support of their second studio album, It Won't Be Soon Before Long (2007). The tour began on September 29, 2007 in Auburn Hills, Michigan and concluded on December 17, 2008 in Cape Town, South Africa, comprising 93 concerts.

Opening acts
 OneRepublic
 Sara Bareilles
 Brandi Carlile
 Ry Cuming
 Kanye West
 Kevin Michael
 Dashboard Confessional
 Phantom Planet
 Duran Duran
 Martin Solveig
 Los Claxons
 Soft
 The Hives
 Captain Stu
 Goldfish
 The Parlotones

Setlist

Music videos
The two music videos was based on the tour are "Story" and "Japan Tour 2008". The first video was "Japan Tour 2008", was released on July 11, 2008 by Amnesty International, and was used with the original version of the song "If I Never See Your Face Again", where Maroon 5 heading to Japan was part of the tour. The second video titled "Story" released in 2009, the video was used with a song of the same name, where the band performing during the tour. The latter video released to raise awareness for the Harlem Children's Zone. Both videos are mainly an animated slideshow, which was created by the animated company Vitamin and directed by Bob Carmichael.

Shows

Cancelled shows

Notes

References

2007 concert tours
2008 concert tours
Maroon 5 concert tours
Concert tours of North America
Concert tours of South America
Concert tours of the United States
Concert tours of Asia
Concert tours of Europe